Ólafsdóttir is an Icelandic patronymic. Notable people with the name include:

Alda Olafsdottir, known as simply Alda, Icelandic pop singer and songwriter
Anna Mjöll Ólafsdóttir, Icelandic jazz singer and songwriter
Anna Ólafsdóttir (born 1932), Icelandic former swimmer
Auður Ava Ólafsdóttir (born 1958), Icelandic professor of art history, a novelist, playwright and poet
Auður Íris Ólafsdóttir (born 1992), Icelandic basketball coach and player, former member of the Icelandic national basketball team
Björt Ólafsdóttir, Icelandic politician who represented Bright Future in the Althing 2013–17
Bryndís Ólafsdóttir (born 1969), retired Icelandic freestyle swimmer
Doris Olafsdóttir (born 1986), Faroese former footballer
Edda Run Olafsdottir (born 1978), a founding member of Amiina, an Icelandic band
Gyrid Olafsdottir, according to legends a Swedish princess and a Danish queen consort as the spouse of King Harald Bluetooth of Denmark
Helena Ólafsdóttir (born 1969), Icelandic football manager and former player
Kolbrún Ólafsdóttir (1933–1960), Icelandic swimmer
Laufey Ólafsdóttir, Icelandic football midfielder
María Ólafsdóttir (born 1993), Icelandic singer, musician, and actress
Sigrún Björg Ólafsdóttir (born 2001), Icelandic basketball player
Þorgerður Ólafsdóttir, Icelandic visual artist
Thuridur Olafsdottir (died 1678), alleged Icelandic witch